Frederick Luke VC (29 September 1895 – 12 March 1983) was an English recipient of the Victoria Cross, the highest and most prestigious award for gallantry in the face of the enemy that can be awarded to British and Commonwealth forces.

Details
He was 18 years old, and a Driver in the 37th Battery, Royal Field Artillery, British Army during the First World War when the following deed took place for which he was awarded the VC.

On 26 August 1914 at Le Cateau, France, when a captain (Douglas Reynolds) of the same battery was trying to save two guns which had been recaptured, Driver Luke and another driver (Job Henry Charles Drain) volunteered to help and gave great assistance in the eventual saving of one of the guns.

He later achieved the rank of sergeant and served during World War II as a ground gunner with the Royal Air Force.

Fred Luke was a guest of honour of 93 Le cateau Field Battery shortly before his death when members of the battery were awed to meet this living legend. Gnrs Raymond Pulman and Peter Jackson formed a special guard of honour on that proud day.

For a number of years until his death on 12 March 1983, Frederick Luke was listed in the Guinness Book of World Records as the oldest living holder of the Victoria Cross.

The medal
His VC is on display in the Lord Ashcroft Gallery at the Imperial War Museum, London.

References

Monuments to Courage (David Harvey, 1999)
The Register of the Victoria Cross (This England, 1997)
Scotland's Forgotten Valour (Graham Ross, 1995)
VCs of the First World War - 1914 (Gerald Gliddon, 1994)

External links
Location of grave and VC medal (Glasgow)

1895 births
1983 deaths
Royal Air Force personnel of World War II
Military personnel from Hampshire
British World War I recipients of the Victoria Cross
Royal Field Artillery soldiers
British Army personnel of World War I
People from Test Valley
British Army recipients of the Victoria Cross